Sirius is a diffraction-limited storage ring synchrotron light source at the Laboratório Nacional de Luz Síncrotron in Campinas, São Paulo State, Brazil. The produced synchrotron radiation covers the range of infrared, optical, ultraviolet and X-ray light.

Costing R$1.8 billion, it was funded by the Ministry of Science, Technology, Innovation and Communication (Brazil) and the São Paulo Research Foundation. Discussion started in 2008, and initial funding of R$2 million was granted in 2009. Construction started in 2015, and is due to open in 2018.

With its construction near the end, Sirius will be the second particle accelerator in Brazil, next to the UVX, also operator by the LNLS. Brazil and Argentina are the only countries in South America to operate particle accelerators.

Characteristics
The tool will be used to understand the atomic structure of substances with which scientists are going to work, which can help in the development of new drugs, in the enhancement of materials used in construction, oil exploration and in many other areas. The 68,000-square-meter building will house a ring-shaped, circumferential 500-meter facility. To protect people from the radiation released by machine operation, designed to be the most advanced of its kind in the world, the whole will be shielded by 1 kilometer of concrete walls. A barrier of 1.5 meters thick and 3 meters high. The investment in the project is R$1.8 billion, the most ambitious scientific project ever made in Brazil. It is expected to be completed by 2018 and operating by 2019, although its project is expected to be fulfilled in 2020.

According to project scientists, Sirius will have the ability to project matter under pressure equivalent to that of the planet's Jupiter nucleus, being the first particle accelerator with such capacity (it is currently able to simulate the Earth's core pressure)

References

External links 

Synchrotron radiation facilities
Science and technology in Brazil